Gechi Qeshlaq Hajj Mohammadlu (also Romanized as Gechī Qeshlāq Ḩājj Moḩammadlū) is a village in Angut-e Gharbi Rural District, Anguti District, Germi County, Ardabil Province, Iran. At the 2006 census, its population was 50, in 10 families.

References 

Towns and villages in Germi County